Stanich is a surname of Serbian, Croatian or Slovenian origin. It is derived from Stanislav. The native form is Stanić. Notable people with the name include:

Christopher Vincent Stanich (1902–1987), New Zealand master mariner, harbourmaster and waterfront controller
George Stanich (born 1928), American high jumper and basketball player
John Stanich (born 1925), American basketball player

References

Serbian surnames
Croatian surnames
Slovene-language surnames